The Minister of Foreign Affairs of Portugal is in charge of conducting the foreign policy established by the Portuguese government, representing the country in many international meetings. The current minister is João Gomes Cravinho.

The following is a list of office holders since 1936:

Ministers of Foreign Affairs
 1936–1947: António de Oliveira Salazar
 1947–1950: José Caeiro da Mata
 1950–1956: Paulo Cunha (1st time)
 1956–1957: Marcelo Caetano (1st time)
 1957: Paulo Cunha (2nd time)
 1957: Marcelo Caetano (2nd time)
 1957–1958: Paulo Cunha (3rd time)
 1958–1961: Marcello Mathias
 1961–1969: Alberto Franco Nogueira
 1969–1970: Marcelo Caetano (3rd time)
 1970–1974: Rui Patrício
 1974–1975: Mário Soares (1st time), 1st after the Carnation Revolution
 1975: Ernesto Melo Antunes (1st time)
 1975: Mário Ruivo
 1975–1976: Ernesto Melo Antunes (2nd time)
 1976–1977: José Medeiros Ferreira (1st time)
 1977–1978: Mário Soares (2nd time)
 1978: Victor de Sá Machado
 1978: Carlos Correia Gago
 1978: José Medeiros Ferreira (2nd time)
 1978–1980: João Carlos Lopes Cardoso
 1980–1981: Diogo Freitas do Amaral (1st time)
 1981–1982: André Gonçalves Pereira
 1982–1983: Vasco Futscher Pereira
 1983–1985: Jaime Gama (1st time)
 1985–1987: Pedro Pires de Miranda
 1987–1992: João de Deus Pinheiro
 1992–1995: José Manuel Durão Barroso
 1995–2002: Jaime Gama (2nd time)
 2002–2003: António Martins da Cruz
 2003–2004: Teresa Patrício de Gouveia
 2004–2005: António Monteiro
 2005–2006: Diogo Freitas do Amaral (2nd time)
 2006–2011: Luís Amado
 2011–2013: Paulo Portas
 2013–2015: Rui Machete
 2015–2022: Augusto Santos Silva
 2022: António Costa
 2022–present: João Gomes Cravinho

References

External links
 Portuguese Ministry of Foreign Affairs 

Main
Portugal
Foreign min